El Tambo is one of seven cantons located in Cañar Province, Ecuador.  It is situated along the PanAmerican highway in a valley across from the larger town of Cañar.  The population of El Tambo is a mix of mestizo and indigenous Cañari.

About 30 minutes out of El Tambo is the town of Ingapirca named after the Incan ruins that are there.  The ruins of Ingapirca are the largest Incan ruins in Ecuador.

External links
El Tambo travel destination

Cantons of Cañar Province